The Kakori Shaikh are a Muslim community found in the state of Uttar Pradesh in India. They are also found in the province of Sindh in Pakistan, particularly the city of Karachi.

History and origin

The town of Kakori in Lucknow district is home to a number of Alavi, Manihar    and Abbasi families, and word Kakorvi Shaikh literally means the Shaikhs of the town of Kakori. The term Shaikh (Arabic: , shaykh; pl.  shuyūkh), is a word or honorific term in the Arabic language that literally means "elder." It is commonly used to designate an elder of a tribe, a revered wise man, or an Islamic scholar. In India, the Shaikh title is used by the descendants of Arab and other Muslim immigrants who settled in South Asia, and signifies Arab descent. From the beginning of Muslim rule in South Asia in 713 AD, technocrats, bureaucrats, soldiers, traders, scientists, architects, teachers, theologians and Sufis flocked from the rest of the Muslim world, to the Islamic Sultanate in South Asia and settled permanently. The descendants of these Arabs usually use the title of Shaikh. These Shaikh family often claim descent from the early Caliphs of Islam.

The of Kakorvi Shaikh are sometimes referred to as Moulvizadigan (Moulvis) and Makhdoomzadigan (Makhdooms), Alavis indicating that they are descendants of Mullah Abu Bakr Jami Alavi, who settled in Kakori in 1461 and/or descendants of Qari Amir Saifuddin Alavi, who settled in Kakori in 1512.They belong by and large to the Alavi and Abbasi families, who settled in the Awadh region from the 12th.Century onwards. According to a classical Urdu work, the Nafhatun Nasim, which is a record of scions of a 16th-century sage Mullah Abdul Karim Alavi and which was later published by Amir Ahmed Alavi in 1934, and is an historic account of the settlement of these Alavi Shaikhs in the town of Kakori. The name Alavi signifies ancestry from Ali ibn Abi Talib, the fourth Caliph of Sunni Islam and the first Imam in Shia Islam. Ali was the cousin and son-in-law of Muhammad. In addition, the other major group Shaikh settled in Kakori are the Abbasis. The name denotes descent from Abbas ibn Abd-al-Muttalib, the paternal uncle of Muhammad. The Abbasid caliphate was established by the Abbasi clan and ruled the Middle East during 750–1258AD (510 years). The Hashmities of Kakori are mainly in Karachi, Pakistan.

Genealogies

The Abbasiyan-i- Kakori, is the family tree of Kakorian Abbasi families by Muhammad Hasan Abbasi which was published in 1945. In its present form, Hashimites of Kakori contains genealogical records of an intricate familial hierarchy that evolved predominantly from three houses, the Moulvis, Makhdooms [cf Alavi] and Qazis [cf Abbasi].  The patriarchs of all three houses were émigrés hailing from the Banu Hashim clan [cf Hashemites] of the Quraysh tribe of Hejaz (in present-day Saudi Arabia) [cf Banu Quraysh], who settled in Kakori since the early advent of Islam in the region, back in the 15th century.

Their ensuing generations, being passionate in their resolve to protect their Arab heritage, have fostered matrimonial alliances preferentially with the people of authentic Arab descent to embrace allies into their folds, thereby, cultivating a very tradition-bound society with its home in Kakori until the diaspora following the foundation of Pakistan in 1947. Today, Kakorian Hashimites are spread far and wide across Australia, Canada, Europe, India, Middle East, Pakistan, UK, and USA.  The website Hashimites of Kakori, compiled and hosted by  a Canadian Academic, Dr. Misbahuddin Zafar Alavi  since 2006, is one of the largest listing of Alavi and Abbasi families comprising over 11,000 interlinked records spanning almost 1600 years showing in some cases 50 generations of Alavi and 60 generations of Abbasi families.

Manihar
The word Manihar is derived from Man, meaning heart in English, and the agentive sufix har. Their traditional landowners and martial race, and some time selling Glass bangles and makers of Gunpowder they are also known as Atishbaz, Maniharzada and shekh siddiqui, this word being derived from they claims descent from the first Caliph of Islam, Abu Bakr, and as such are sub-group of the shekh Siddiqui community.

Their main clans are the Bachchal, Bhadauriya, bhale sultan, Chandel, Milki, mian, Kachchoiyana, Rana, Khalri, Talwar, Turk, Uzbek, Parmaar, Rohilla, Rananjay and Raikwar. Some of these clans are territorial groupings, others reflect a background from originating from other communities, such as the Kachwaha and Parmar. The community uses the surname shekh Siddiqui. A section of the Manihar are Rajput and Brahmin converts to Islam.

References

Sources
 Nafhatun Nasim, by Amir Ahmed Alavi published in 1934
 Abbasiyan-i- Kakori, the family tree of Kakorian Abbasi family by Muhammad Hasan Abbasi, published in 1945.

External links
 Hashimites of Kakori

Social groups of Pakistan
Muslim communities of India
Pakistani people of Arab descent
Social groups of Uttar Pradesh
Surnames
Hashemite people
Muslim communities of Uttar Pradesh